Mis Íntimas Razones (My Intimate Reasons) is the 12th album by Mexican iconic pop singer Lucía Méndez, It was released in 1988 as she was filming the telenovela El Extraño Retorno de Diana Salazar.

Track listing
 Un Alma en Pena
 Te Me Vuelves Soledad
 Aventurero
 Llegaré
 Mis Íntimas Razones
 Rueda el Amor
 Cuatro Semanas
 Rota de Amor
 Mal Enamorada
 Morir un Poco
 Mala Jugada

Singles
 Aventurero
 Un Alma en Pena
 Morir un Poco

Video Clips
 Aventurero
 Un Alma en Pena

1988 albums
Lucía Méndez albums